Ophthalmic acid, also known as ophthalmate (chemically L-γ-glutamyl-L-α-aminobutyrylglycine), is a tripeptide analog of glutathione in which the cysteine group is replaced by L-2-aminobutyrate. It was first discovered and isolated from calf lens.

Biosynthesis
Recent studies have shown that the ophthalmate can be biologically synthesized from 2-amino butyric acid through consecutive reactions with gamma-glutamylcysteine synthetase and glutathione synthetase. So the ophthalmic acid could be used as a biomarker in oxidative stress where the depletion of glutathione takes place.

See also
Aminobutyrate
Glutathione
Glutathione synthetase deficiency
Oxidative stress

References

Tripeptides